Anthony Seibold (born 3 October 1974) is an Australian rugby union coach, and former rugby league coach and player. He is currently defence coach with the England national rugby union team, and coach for the Manly Warringah Sea Eagles NRL team. 
 
Seibold played rugby league for the Brisbane Broncos, Saint-Esteve, Canberra Raiders, London Broncos and Hull Kingston Rovers.

After retiring, he moved into coaching, and was head coach of the South Sydney Rabbitohs in the 2018 NRL season, and of the Brisbane Broncos from 2019 to  2020. He moved to rugby union and joined England in September 2021.

Background
Anthony Seibold was born in Rockhampton, Queensland, Australia, and is of German descent from his grandfather, and predominantly Irish and English from his paternal grandmother's side.

Playing career

Canberra Raiders
As a player, Seibold had stints in the lower grades at the Brisbane Broncos (1992–1995) and in the National Rugby League with the Canberra Raiders (1997–1998).

London Broncos
In 1999 Seibold signed for the London Broncos where he played two seasons in the Super League.

Ipswich Jets
Seibold played for the Ipswich Jets in the 2002 Queensland Cup Grand Final before returning to the UK.

Hull KR
In 2003 Seibold signed for the Hull Kingston Rovers, where he captained the team during their 2003 and 2004 seasons having his best season during his career with the team from East Hull.

Toowoomba Clydesdales
He returned to the Brisbane Broncos organisation in 2005 where he captained the Toowoomba Clydesdales team in the 2005 Queensland Cup.

Coaching career
Seibold has a Bachelor of Teaching and a Masters of Education and lectured in the Faculty of Education at the University of Southern Queensland after his retirement from playing.
In 2006, he moved to Wales where he was assistant coach at Celtic Crusaders between 2006 and 2009, playing in the first season. He helped to lead the club to Super League and assisted John Dixon in their first season at that level.

South Wales Scorpions
Following his spell at Crusaders, he took on his first head coach role, at South Wales Scorpions where he led the club to the play-offs in the club's first ever season. He then moved back to Australia to coach in the Queensland Cup.

Manly Warringah Sea Eagles
After working as an assistant coach at the Melbourne Storm under Craig Bellamy, Seibold was recruited to join the Manly-Warringah Sea Eagles. He was also an assistant coach of the Queensland Maroons State of Origin team. On 8 November 2022, Seibold was appointed coach of the Manly Warringah Sea Eagles following the sacking of their former coach Des Hasler.

South Sydney Rabbitohs
On 6 October 2017, Seibold  was announced as the new South Sydney Rabbitohs coach.

In his first year as Souths coach, Seibold guided the club to a third-placed finish at the end of the regular season.  Souths went on to reach the preliminary final but fell short of a grand final appearance losing 12-4 to Sydney Roosters.  On 27 September 2018, Seibold was named Dally M coach of the year.

In November 2018, Seibold angrily spoke to the media about a possible switch with Brisbane coach Wayne Bennett.  He went on to say “I have had a gutful. I’ve been sitting here for four weeks and feeling like a punching bag. It’s not acceptable and it’s not fair … He’s (Wayne Bennett) been ringing up the Souths boys but then tells his press conference he hasn’t spoken to anyone. That’s absolute bullshit … I’m sick of Wayne carrying on.

Brisbane Broncos
On 2 December 2018, Seibold was announced as the new Brisbane Broncos coach from 2019 onwards, a year earlier than expected, after Wayne Bennett was sacked as coach.

The 2019 season started off badly for Seibold and Brisbane as the club endured their equal worst start to a season since the club entered the competition in 1988.  This included a 4-36 loss against the Sydney Roosters at the Sydney Cricket Ground.  Between rounds 16 and 24, Brisbane only lost 2 out of 8 games and qualified for the finals with a 17-16 victory over the Parramatta Eels at Suncorp Stadium.

In the 2019 elimination final against Parramatta, Brisbane suffered their worst ever defeat (at the time) and were also handed the biggest loss in finals history losing 58-0 at the new Western Sydney Stadium.  In the post match press conference, Seibold said “I’m really disappointed, I’m embarrassed. I can’t toss up any excuses for that. I’ll wear it, I’m the coach of the club so I’ll take responsibility but it’s also my job to fix that.  "I got a whiff of it last week leading into the Bulldogs game. Maybe I was too optimistic. It was men against boys today, it was embarrassing".

Brisbane started the 2020 NRL season with two wins in a row against North Queensland and Seibold's former team, South Sydney. Brisbane maintained 5th position during the two rounds of the season before its suspension due to the outbreak of COVID-19 in Australia. Upon the resumption of the season on May 28, Brisbane were defeated 34-6 by the Parramatta Eels. The following week, Brisbane were again on the wrong end of a big score line, losing to the Sydney Roosters 59-0. This broke the record for the largest defeat in Broncos history. Brisbane went on to lose four more matches in a row, before defeating the Canterbury-Bankstown Bulldogs 26-8 in Round 9, snapping the Broncos' six game losing streak and giving them their third and final win for the 2020 season. Brisbane lost the next four matches against the Wests Tigers, Melbourne, Cronulla-Sutherland and Souths. Following the Round 13 loss against South Sydney, Seibold took a leave of absence to be with his family in Sydney, with Peter Gentle taking over the coaching duties.

After multiple media outlets reported that Brisbane offered Seibold $1 million to depart the club, both parties agreed to an early termination of Seibold's contract, following Brisbane losing 10 games in the season with Seibold at the helm.
Seibold left the club having been the only coach to not have a winning record with a ratio of only 34%.  Under Seibold, 2020 was the worst year in Brisbane's history with only 3 wins from 20 matches and a points differential of -356 resulting in the club's first wooden spoon.

He later joined the Newcastle Knights as an assistant for the 2021 season.

Manly-Warringah Sea Eagles
In November 2022, Seibold signed a three-year deal to become the new head coach of Manly-Warringah.

Rugby union
Seibold joined the England national rugby union team in September 2021, working as a defence coach under Australian head coach Eddie Jones.

References

External links
Brisbane Broncos profile
South Sydney Rabbitohs profile

1974 births
Living people
AS Saint Estève players
Australian expatriate rugby league players
Australian expatriate sportspeople in England
Australian expatriate sportspeople in France
Australian people of German descent
Australian rugby league coaches
Australian rugby league players
Brisbane Broncos coaches
Canberra Raiders players
Expatriate rugby league players in England
Expatriate rugby league players in France
Germany national rugby league team players
Hull Kingston Rovers players
Ipswich Jets players
London Broncos players
North Wales Crusaders players
Rugby league players from Rockhampton, Queensland
Rugby league props
South Sydney Rabbitohs coaches
South Wales Scorpions coaches
Toowoomba Clydesdales players